This page covers all the important events in the sport of tennis in 2019. Primarily, it provides the results of notable tournaments throughout the year on both the ATP and WTA Tours, the Davis Cup, and the Fed Cup.

ITF

Grand Slam events

Davis Cup

Knockout stage

Fed Cup

IOC
 July 19 – August 4: 2019 Pan American Games
 December 1–7: Southeast Asian Games

Important events

Other tennis events
 December 29, 2018 – January 5: 2019 Hopman Cup in  Perth
 In the final,  Switzerland (Roger Federer & Belinda Bencic) defeated  Germany (Alexander Zverev & Angelique Kerber), 2–1.
 September 20–22: 2019 Laver Cup in  Geneva
  Team Europe defeated  Team World, 13–11, to win their third Laver Cup title.

Non ATP or WTA tournaments

Exhibition
 December 27 – 29, 2018: 2018 Mubadala World Tennis Championship in  Abu Dhabi
 Men's Singles:  Novak Djokovic defeated  Kevin Anderson, 4–6, 7–5, 7–5.
 Women's Singles:  Venus Williams defeated  Serena Williams, 4–6, 6–3, [10–8].

Multi-sport games

 May 27 – June 1: Games of the Small States of Europe in  Budva
 July 3 – 14: Summer Universiade in  Naples
 July 6 – 12: Island Games in 
 July 8 – 20: Pacific Games in  Apia
 Men's singles: Colin Sinclair (Northern Mariana Islands)
 Men's doubles: Matavo Fanguna / Semisi Fanguna (Tonga)
 Men's team: Northern Mariana Islands
 Women's singles: Abigail Tere-Apisah (Papua New Guinea)
 Women's doubles: Abigail Tere-Apisah / Violet Apisah (Papua New Guinea)
 Women's team: Papua New Guinea
 July 19 – 28: 2019 Indian Ocean Island Games in  Port Louis
 July 21 – 27: European Youth Summer Olympic Festival in  Baku
 July 26 – August 11: Pan American Games in  Lima
 August 16 – 31: African Games in  Rabat
 November 30 – December 11: Southeast Asian Games in  Clark, Subic, and Metro Manila
 December 1 – 13: 2019 South Asian Games in  Kathmandu and Pokhara

References

External links
Official website of the Association of Tennis Professionals (ATP)
Official website of the Women's Tennis Association (WTA)
Official website of the International Tennis Federation (ITF)
Official website of the International Team Competition in Men's Tennis (Davis Cup)
Official website of the International Team Competition in Women's Tennis (Fed Cup)

 
Tennis by year